All Too Real is an album by saxophonist Vincent Herring which was recorded in 2002 and released on the Highnote label the following year.

Reception

Allmusic reviewed the album stating "Herring has developed his own personal voice on alto and has developed into a strong soprano sax player, too. This straight-ahead hard bop set finds Herring in top form ... The seven instrumentals feature Herring at the peak of his creative powers, making this one of his strongest recordings to date".  JazzTimes observed "Herring’s latest album, All Too Real (HighNote), once again demonstrates his firm command of the hard-bop language. ... Herring offers a stimulating program that includes some hard-bop-style up-tunes, a gentle waltz and an uptempo Latin number".

Track listing 
All compositions by Vincent Herring except where noted
 "Yoko's Delight" – 6:38	
 "Athlolete" – 6:00
 "Invitation" (Bronisław Kaper, Paul Francis Webster) – 5:54	
 "The Rain" – 6:26
 "The Herring Pelt Clause" – 4:04
 "Piece Part 2" – 5:14
 "Love for Sale" (Cole Porter) – 8:20
 "I'll Sing You a Lullaby" – 5:44

Personnel 
Vincent Herring – alto saxophone, soprano saxophone
Jeremy Pelt – trumpet (tracks 1, 2 & 5)
Anthony Wonsey – piano
Richie Goods – bass
E.J. Strickland – drums
Jill Seiffers – vocals (track 8)

Production
Vincent Herring – producer
David Baker – engineer

References 

Vincent Herring albums
2003 albums
HighNote Records albums